Events in the year 1738 in Norway.

Incumbents
Monarch: Christian VI

Events
Theater was banned in Norway.

Arts and literature

Births

Deaths

17 March – Peder Colbjørnsen, timber merchant and war hero (born 1683).

See also

References